XHCDH-FM is a radio station on 104.1 FM in Ciudad Cuauhtémoc, Chihuahua, Mexico. The station is owned by Grupo BM Radio and known as La Sabrosita with a grupera format.

History
XHCDH received its concession on November 30, 1994. It was owned by José Guadalupe Bernal Vázquez.

References

Radio stations in Chihuahua